Old Bolsover Town Council is the parish council for the civil parish of Old Bolsover in Derbyshire, England.  It has responsibility for local issues in the town of Bolsover, including setting an annual precept (local rate) to cover the council's operating costs and producing annual accounts for public scrutiny. The town council evaluates local planning applications and works with the local police, district council officers, and neighbourhood watch groups on matters of crime, security, and traffic. The town council's role also includes initiating projects for the maintenance and repair of parish facilities, as well as consulting with the district council on the maintenance, repair, and improvement of highways, drainage, footpaths, public transport, and street cleaning. Conservation matters (including trees and listed buildings) and environmental issues are also the responsibility of the council.

Other local government functions are the responsibility of Bolsover District Council and Derbyshire County Council.

The Town Council was formed in 1974 when the civil parish of Old Bolsover was created as a successor parish to the former Bolsover Urban District Council.  The new parish council exercised its right to designate itself a town council.

The Town Council has been meeting in the Town Hall on Cotton Street since 1976.  The Town Hall has had a chequered history. Built as a Primitive Methodist Chapel, it later transferred to the Salvation Army and in 1911 first became council offices. In 1948 all council functions transferred to nearby Sherwood Lodge, now along with a 1990s extension home to Bolsover (district) Council. The Town Hall on Cotton Street then became the town's first Public Library, a branch of Derbyshire County Library. Following the erection of the new library nearby, it reverted to its council function as offices for Old Bolsover Town Council.

References

External links 
Old Bolsover Town Council website

Bolsover
Local government in Derbyshire
Parish councils of England
Local authorities in Derbyshire